Danny Masseling (born 20 June 1981), better known by his stage name Angerfist, is a Dutch hardcore producer and DJ.

Aside from his main alias, he also produces for other genres and subgenres under various aliases and is part of the following groups: The Supreme Team (with Outblast, Tha Playah & Evil Activities), Masters Elite (with Catscan and Outblast), and Roland & Sherman (with Outblast).

During live acts, he is accompanied by MC Prozac (Minne Roos).

Career
Angerfist started making music at the age of 16. Beginning with 4-beat programmed loops and breakbeats, his interest in producing music started to grow. He began his career in 2001 after sending a demo to Mark Vos, also known as DJ Buzz Fuzz, director of BZRK Records. Vos liked the tape and signed Angerfist, who then released his first EPs under the names "Menace II Society" and "Angerfist". Angerfist soon gained popularity in the "gabber scene" because of the aggressive nustyle sound he made. His style is characterized by hard bass drums and vocals sampled from various media, especially films. He already has some hardcore hits to his name, including: "Dance With The Wolves", "Raise Your Fist", and "Riotstarter". His increasing popularity gave him the opportunity to produce the anthem for Masters of Hardcore in 2005, titled "The World Will Shiver".

Angerfist has performed at many well known events such as Sensation Black, Masters of Hardcore, Defqon. 1, Mysteryland, and Dominator. He gained the prestigious 39th spot in DJ Mag's Top 100 DJ edition of 2011, dropping to 42nd on the following year and rising to 34th place in 2013, thus being the number 1 hardcore act in the list. As of 2020, his highest ranking on the list was No. 29, which he achieved in 2018. He is currently ranked No. 33 on DJ Mag list for 2019.

In July 2013, it was announced that the Bloodcage project would feature MC Prozac (in his alias of DJ Bloodcage) as the live face of the project, while still involving both artists (MC Prozac and Angerfist) in its studio output.

From September 2021 during Covid-19 pandemic he also started playing games with fans on streams - also known as AngerGames. 

During live acts with his MC, they almost always perform wearing specially designed ice hockey masks and black or white hoodies.

Discography

Albums
Pissin' Razorbladez (2006)
Mutilate (2008)
Retaliate (2011)
The Deadfaced Dimension (2014)
Raise & Revolt (2015)
Creed of Chaos (2017)
Diabolic Dice (2019)

Singles and EPs

Remixes

Free releases

References

External links 

Official website
Youtube
Spotify 
Steam 
Soundcloud 
Angerfist on Discogs

1981 births
Living people
Dutch DJs
Dutch electronic musicians
Electronic dance music DJs
Hardcore techno musicians
Masked musicians
Musicians from Flevoland
People from Almere